Mikhail Elgin and Mateusz Kowalczyk were the defending champions, but only Kowalczyk chose to participate, partnering Kamil Majchrzak. Kowalczyk and Majchrzak lost in the final to Aleksandre Metreveli and Peng Hsien-yin 6–4, 3–6, [10–8].

Seeds

Draw

External Links
 Main Draw
 Qualifying Draw

Poznan Open - Doubles
2016 Doubles